The Nakajima Ha219, (also known as the Ha-44 under the unified designation system, BH by the company and NK11A by the Imperial Japanese Navy Air Service (IJNAS)),  was a late war Imperial Japanese Army Air Force (IJAAF)  18-cylinder air-cooled radial engine, used on the Tachikawa Ki-94-II, Nakajima Ki-84-N and Nakajima Ki-87.

Variants and designations
Data from: Japanese Aero-Engines 1910-1945
BH Company designation
Ha219 IJAAF Hatsudoki designation
Ha219Ru fitted with a large turbo-charger alternative designation for the Ha-44 model 12
Ha-44 Unified (IJAAF & IJNAS) designation system
Ha-44 model 11 A prototype turbocharged  engine for the Ki-87.
Ha-44 model 12 Similar to the Model 11 and probably sporting a 16-bladed cooling fan in the cowling intake.
Ha-44 model 13 A planned variant to power the Navy 20-shi A Carrier Fighter
NK11A Planned engines for a scaled down Nakajima G10N1 (Navy Experimental Heavy Bomber Fugaku) (Fugaku - Mount Fuji)

Applications
A total of around 10 engines were built, but the engine suffered from over-heating at low speeds and required large amounts of maintenance. Around 7 were issued to the Kitai squadron in late 1945 and used on the new Ki-84-N, lacking the supercharger installed on the Ki-94-2 and Ki-87. most are believed to have been scrapped or destroyed after the war along with documentation.
 Nakajima Ki-87
 Nakajima G10N1 (Navy Experimental Heavy Bomber Fugaku)
 Nakajima Ki-84-N
 Tachikawa Ki-94-2

Specifications (Ha219 / BH / NK11A / Ha-44)

References

Aircraft air-cooled radial piston engines
1940s aircraft piston engines
Nakajima aircraft engines